Endura may refer to:

 a practice (fr) of the Cathars: a ritualistic fasting in order to speed death
 Endura (band), a dark ambient group active in the 1990s
 Endura (cycling apparel), a brand owned by Pentland Group
 Endura-D, an engine built by Ford Motor Company
 Endura, an EP by Ever We Fall
 Endura Watch Factory, a "Private Label" watch manufacturing company of the Swatch Group
 Endura Racing a British cycling team

See also
 Enduro (disambiguation)